Alt Pirineu Natural Park is the largest natural park in Catalonia, Spain. It stretches over the comarques of Pallars Sobirà and Alt Urgell.

References

External links
 

Alt Urgell
Natural parks of Catalonia
Pallars Sobirà
Province of Lleida
Protected areas established in 2003
Protected areas of the Pyrenees
2003 establishments in Spain
Pyrenees conifer and mixed forests